Youssef Chahine (25 January 1926 – 27 July 2008) was an Egyptian film director. He was active in the Egyptian film industry from 1950 until his death. He directed twelve films that were listed in the Top 100 Egyptian films list. A winner of the Cannes 50th Anniversary Award (for lifetime achievement).

Youssef Chahine is credited for directing five films starring Salah Zulfikar including significant productions such as Saladin (1963), The Nile and the Life (1968) and Those People of the Nile (1972) and also credited with discovering Omar Sharif, whose first starring role was in Chahine's film The Blazing Sun (1954). A well-regarded director with critics, he was often present at film festivals during the earlier decades of his work. Chahine gained his largest international audiences as one of the co-directors of 11'9"01 September 11 (2002).

Filmography

See also
Top 100 Egyptian films
Salah Zulfikar filmography
Faten Hamama filmography

References

Egyptian filmographies
Director filmographies